Tomáš Komara (born 23 May 1994) is a Slovak football midfielder who plays for 3. liga club 1. FC Tatran Prešov.

Career
He made his professional debut for FK Senica against AS Trenčín on 4 August 2013.

External links
FK Senica profile

References

1994 births
Living people
Slovak footballers
Association football midfielders
FK Senica players
TJ Valašské Meziříčí players
FK Hodonín players
1. FC Tatran Prešov players
Slovak Super Liga players
Expatriate footballers in the Czech Republic